Elko is a surname. Notable people with the surname include:

 Bill Elko (born 1959), American football player
 Mike Elko (born 1977), American football coach
 Nicholas Elko (1909–1991), American bishop